David Hilary "Biff" Lee (December 6, 1907 – July 5, 1986) was an American football player. 

Lee was born in Wolf Island, Missouri, in 1907.

He played college football for Missouri and Oklahoma. He was selected by the Associated Press as a first-team guard on the 1930 All-Big Six Conference football team.

He also played professional football in the National Football League (NFL) as a guard for the Cleveland Indians (1931), Portsmouth Spartans (1931), and Cincinnati Reds (1933–1934). He appeared in 26 NFL games, 10 as a starter. He kicked one field goal in 1933. He was obtained by the Reds in a transaction with the Providence, Rhode Island, football team.

After retiring from football, he worked for the Missouri State Employment Service and lived in Caruthersville, Missouri. He served in the Army from 1942 to 1945. He was married to Grace Lee with whom he had three children, David H. Lee Jr. (born c 1930), Mabelanna Lee (born c 1933) and Mary S. Lee (born c 1941). He died in 1986 at age 78.

References

1907 births
1986 deaths
Missouri Tigers football players
Oklahoma Sooners football players
Cleveland Indians (NFL) players
Portsmouth Spartans players
Cincinnati Reds (NFL) players
Players of American football from Missouri